La Cucaracha ("The Cockroach") is a popular Mexican folk song about a cockroach who cannot walk. The song's origins are unclear, but it dates back at least to the 1910s during the Mexican Revolution. The song belongs to the Mexican  genre. The song's melody is widely known and there are many alternative stanzas.

Structure

The song consists of verse-and-refrain (strophe-antistrophe) pairs, with each half of each pair consisting of four lines featuring an ABCB rhyme scheme.

Refrain

The song's earliest lyrics, from which its name is derived, concern a cockroach that has lost one of its six legs and struggles to walk with the remaining five. The cockroach's uneven, five-legged gait is imitated by the song's original, 5/4 meter, formed by removing one upbeat (corresponding to the missing sixth leg) from the second half of a 6/4 measure:

La cu-ca- | ra-cha, la cu-ca-ra-cha
| ya no pue-de ca-mi-nar
por-que no | tie-ne, por-que le fal-tan
| las dos pa- titas "de" a-trás.— 

("The cockroach, the cockroach / can no longer walk / because she doesn't have, because she lacks / the two hind legs to walk"; these lyrics form the basis for the refrain of most later versions. Syllables having primary stress are in boldface; syllables having secondary stress are in roman type; unstressed syllables are in italics. Measure divisions are independent of text line breaks and are indicated by vertical bar lines; note that the refrain begins with an anacrusis/"pickup.")

Many later versions of the song, especially those whose lyrics do not mention the cockroach's missing leg(s), extend the last syllable of each line to fit the more familiar 6/4 meter. Almost all modern versions, however, use a 4/4 meter instead with a clave rhythm to give the feeling of three pulses.

Verses

The song's verses fit a traditional melody separate from that of the refrain but sharing the refrain's meter (either 5/4, 6/4, or 4/4 clave as discussed above). In other respects, they are highly variable, usually providing satirical commentary on contemporary political or social problems or disputes.

Historical evolution

The origins of "La Cucaracha" are obscure. The refrain's lyrics make no explicit reference to historical events; it is difficult, if not impossible, therefore, to date. Because verses are improvised according to the needs of the moment, however, they often enable a rough estimate of their age by mentioning contemporary social or political conditions (thus narrowing a version's possible time of origin to periods in which those conditions prevailed) or referring to specific current or past events (thus setting a maximum boundary for a version's age).

Pre-Revolution lyrics

There exist several early (pre-Revolution) sets of lyrics referring to historical events.

Francisco Rodríguez Marín records in his book Cantos Populares Españoles (1883) with lyrics referencing the then recent Hispano-Moroccan War (1859–1860), being probably developed during the campaign by the troops to boost their morale, on an already existing melody:

Some early versions of the lyrics refer to the confrontation between Moroccan (referred popularly as 'Moors' by the Spanish) and Spanish troops, during the Hispano-Moroccan War that marked the Spanish popular imagery during its development from 1859 to 1860.

One of the earliest written references to the song appears in Mexican writer and political journalist José Joaquín Fernández de Lizardi's 1819 novel La Quijotita y su Prima, where it is suggested that:

Other early stanzas detail such incidents as the Carlist Wars (1833–1876) in Spain and the French intervention in Mexico (1861).

During the Mexican Revolution of the early 20th century, "La Cucaracha" saw the first major period of verse production as rebel and government forces alike invented political lyrics for the song. Many stanzas were added during this period that today it is associated mostly with Mexico.

Revolutionary lyrics
The Mexican Revolution, from 1910 to about 1920, was a period of great political upheaval during which the majority of the stanzas known today were written. Political symbolism was a common theme in these verses, and explicit and implicit references were made to events of the war, major political figures, and the effects of the war on the civilians in general. Today, few pre-Revolution verses are known, and the most commonly quoted portion of the song are the two Villist anti-Huerta stanzas:

This version, popular among Villist soldiers, contains hidden political meanings, as is common for revolutionary songs. In this version, the cockroach represents President Victoriano Huerta, a notorious drunk who was considered a villain and traitor due to his part in the death of revolutionary President Francisco Madero.

Due to the multi-factional nature of the Mexican Revolution, competing versions were also common at the time, including the Huertist, anti-Carranza stanza:

An example of two Zapatist stanzas:

Among Mexican civilians at the time, "La Cucaracha" was also a popular tune, and there are numerous examples of non-aligned political verses. Many such verses were general complaints about the hardships created by the war, and these were often written by pro-Zapatistas. Other non-aligned verses contained references to multiple factions in a non-judgmental manner:

La Cucaracha as a woman

Soldiering has been a life experience for women in Mexico since pre-Columbian times. Among the nicknames for women warriors and camp followers were Soldaderas, Adelitas, Juanas, and Cucarachas.

Soldiers in Porfirio Diaz's army sang "La cucaracha" about a soldadera who wanted money to go to the bullfights. For the Villistas, "'La cucaracha' wanted money for alcohol and marijuana. She was often so drunk or stoned that she could not walk straight," writes Elizabeth Salas in Mexican Military: Myth and History. "Unlike corridos about male revolutionaries like Villa and Zapata, none of the well-known corridos about soldaderas give their real names or are biographical. Consequently, there are very few stanzas that ring true about women in battle or the camps," Salas writes.

Male artists often depicted the soldaderas as semi-disrobed hookers. One etching, by muralist José Clemente Orozco, "The dance of the cucaracha," is especially insulting.

Other verses
Apart from verses making explicit or implicit reference to historical events, hundreds of other verses exist. Some verses are new, and others are ancient; however, the lack of references and the largely oral tradition of the song makes dating these verses difficult, if not impossible. Examples follow:

Influences

In the novel Animal Farm by George Orwell, the animals' rebellion song, "Beasts of England", is described as a blend of the tunes of "La Cucaracha" and "Oh My Darling, Clementine".

The Minecraft mod Alex's Mobs adds cockroackes that dance to an instrumental version of this song when at least one of them given maracas (also added by the mod).

FC Utrecht has a long history of playing the tune at homes games after the team has scored.

Notes

References

External links
What are the words to "La Cucaracha"? on The Straight Dope 	
Version with several references to the Mexican Revolution 	
complete lyric  	
Sheet Music for Wind Orchestra: Parts & Scores

Mexican folk songs
Mexican culture
Spanish-language songs
Bill Haley songs
Mexican folklore
Cannabis music
Mexican corridos
The Champs songs
Songs about insects
Fictional cockroaches
Spanish children's songs